

Station List

D